The US 63 Black River Bridge was a historic bridge, carrying U.S. Route 63 across the Black River at the town of Black Rock, Arkansas. The main section of the bridge was a twelve-span steel Warren truss with open spandrel arches and vertical supports; there were also 23 approach spans. The bridge was built in 1949, and was listed on the National Register of Historic Places in 2000. It has been deemed structurally obsolete by the Arkansas Highway Department, and was demolished in 2015. It was delisted from the National Register in 2017.

See also
 
 
 
 
 List of bridges on the National Register of Historic Places in Arkansas
 National Register of Historic Places listings in Lawrence County, Arkansas

References

Road bridges on the National Register of Historic Places in Arkansas
Bridges completed in 1949
U.S. Route 63
Bridges of the United States Numbered Highway System
National Register of Historic Places in Lawrence County, Arkansas
Former National Register of Historic Places in Arkansas
Steel bridges in the United States
Open-spandrel deck arch bridges in the United States
Warren truss bridges in the United States
Transportation in Lawrence County, Arkansas
1949 establishments in Arkansas
2015 disestablishments in Arkansas
Demolished buildings and structures in Arkansas
Demolished bridges in the United States